The Storm Riders is a 1998 Hong Kong wuxia fantasy film based on the manhua series Fung Wan by artist Ma Wing-shing. Directed by Andrew Lau, it starred Ekin Cheng as Wind and Aaron Kwok as Cloud. The plot involves two children, Whispering Wind and Striding Cloud, who become powerful warriors under the evil Lord Conqueror's tutelage. The sequel to the film, titled The Storm Warriors and directed by the Pang brothers, was released in 2009.

Plot
The evil Lord Conqueror, head of Conqueror's Clan, is given a prophecy by Mud Buddha when quizzed about his delayed duel with Sword Saint. The prophecy translates that if Conqueror finds two young children by the name of Wind and Cloud he will have good fortune. Mud Buddha provides the birth charts of these two and gives him a puzzle box stating that finding Wind and Cloud is but one half of his destiny, the box will provide him with the latter half once he unlocks it. Conqueror issues an order that every boy with a birth chart matching Wind's or Cloud's must become a disciple of the Conqueror's Clan. Whispering Wind is discovered as the son of long time rival Whispering Prince, who Conqueror had beaten 2 years previously and stole Prince's wife. As they fight again for Prince's Blizzard Blade he reveals he only took his wife to anger him into battle to possess the blade. At the climax of the duel, Prince's wife kills herself and Prince is captured and killed by the fire beast in the nearby cave. Conqueror finds Whispering Wind has fainted and claims him. Striding Cloud's father, a blacksmith named Striding Sky, is forging the Ultimate Sword and completes the blade just before Conqueror's forces raze his village. As he is killed he reveals that the sword can only be used by using his own blood and Cloud is taken by the invading forces.

Ten years pass, and Wind and Cloud are now both fully grown and highly skilled martial artists, raised by Lord Conqueror with his daughter Charity and adopted son Frost. The 3 sons act as Generals in Lord Conqueror's army. Wind and Charity begin to form a relationship, but she is seduced by Cloud and secretly has an affair with him. Conqueror is angered by his inability to open the puzzle box, and the disappearance of Mud Buddha. He sends Frost and Wind to find him while Cloud is sent to claim the Unchallenged Sword and kill the clan leader, leading closer to completing his collection of powerful weapons in his Sword Graveyard. Cloud succeeds and Frost and Wind find Mud Buddha, now disfigured by boils as punishment from the Gods for revealing too much about the future to others. Later, Mud Buddha is taken by a masked fighter who easily repels both Frost and Wind. The captured Mud Buddha unlocks the puzzle for Conqueror and reveals that "the dragon is powerful but will be stranded when wind and cloud become a storm" therefore ending Conqueror's tyranny. Realizing it refers to Wind and Cloud and unwilling to accept his fate Conqueror plots to destroy them both.

Upon realizing Cloud is interested in Charity, Conqueror decides to use her to marry Wind in hopes of Wind and Cloud killing each other. Cloud discovers the marriage and is quickly angered. On the day of the wedding Cloud abducts Charity. Conqueror tells Wind to fight for his wife if he is a man. Wind and Cloud engage in a battle and Lord Conqueror tries to kill Cloud in their duel, but Charity sacrifices herself to save him.

As Wind quietly grieves for his love, Cloud fights the Phoenix family for the Ice Vigor and uses it to preserve Charity's body, but is soon discovered by Conqueror. As they fight in a temple in the desert without water, Cloud's Palm style proves to be useless against Conqueror without any source of liquid at the area. Cloud rips off his arm and uses his own blood as a final resort to be used as source of liquid which is necessary for his palm style to unleash considerable amount of power to create an opening for escape. He is then discovered out cold by Muse and her father, Summit Yu. As they nurse him to health Yu discovers that the Fire Beast Arm he has trained to perfection rejects him and wishes to be bonded to Cloud and calls on specialists to bond his arm to Cloud.

Unable to find Cloud, Conqueror moves onto destroying Wind, who he secretly poisons and sends on a mission to claim the Blood Bodhi fruit. As the poison takes its toll Wind remembers the truth about who killed his parents, and uses the Blood Bodhi fruit that grows in the cave to heal himself as well as make himself even stronger. He then defeats the fire beast who killed his father using the Blizzard Blade retrieved by his father's corpse. Cloud trains his new arm with the help of Muse's kindness before deciding to head back to Conqueror's kingdom.

Conqueror, believing himself free of the prophecy, challenges and defeats Sword Saint after the latter is distracted by Muse. Frost arrives and announces his discovery that it was Conqueror who kidnapped Mud Buddha and framed Wind and Cloud. Conqueror, now deluded into the belief he is invincible, kills Frost, who attempts to leave the clan. Soon afterwards, Wind and Cloud meet upon the steps to Conqueror's main hall and, united by their common enemy, confront Conqueror. As the fight spills over into the Sword Graveyard, Wind and Cloud are almost outmatched by Conqueror's superior sword skills. However, the blood from a cut on Cloud's arm reveals to him the location of Ultimate Sword (which Conqueror unknowingly had amongst the standard weapons littering the ground). With Striding Sky's sword in hand, Cloud rejoins Wind in the battle and Conqueror is soon beaten, with Wind stopping Cloud from landing the death blow so Conqueror is left insane and tormented by the ghosts of those he has killed, including his beloved Charity.

Cast
Aaron Kwok as Striding Cloud
Ekin Cheng as Whispering Wind
Sonny Chiba as Lord Conqueror
Kristy Yang as Charity
Michael Tse as Frost
Roy Cheung as Shaolin Monk
Jason Chu as Ming
Wayne Lai as Mud Buddha
Lawrence Cheng as Jester
Anthony Wong as Sword Saint
Alex Fong as Whispering Prince
Yu Rongguang as Striding Sky
Shu Qi as Muse
Wan Yeung-ming as Summit Yu
Christine Ng as Ying
Dion Lam as Hawk
Ng Chi-hung as Bat
Elvis Tsui as Seedy Sword
Lee Siu-kei as Dragon
Xu Jinglei as Phoenix

Awards and nominations

Sequel

Ekin Cheng and Aaron Kwok returned for the sequel, reprising their respective roles as Wind and Cloud. The film was helmed by the Pang brothers and followed the Japanese Invasion story arc of the comics.

They were joined by newcomers to the franchise Hong Kong Cantopop stars Nicholas Tse, Charlene Choi, newcomer Tang Yan and veteran actor Simon Yam. Tse played the villain Heartless while Yam played his father, Lord Godless.

See also
The Storm Warriors
Storm Rider Clash of the Evils
Wind and Cloud
Wind and Cloud 2

References

External links
Love HK Film - The Storm Riders

1998 films
1990s action adventure films
1998 martial arts films
1990s romantic fantasy films
Hong Kong martial arts films
Hong Kong action adventure films
Hong Kong romantic fantasy films
Wuxia films
Golden Harvest films
Fung Wan
Martial arts fantasy films
Films directed by Andrew Lau
Adaptations of works by Ma Wing-shing
Films based on Hong Kong comics
Films based on comic strips
Live-action films based on comics
Discotek Media
1990s Hong Kong films